Kayıklı is a village in the Hasankeyf District of Batman Province in Turkey. The village is populated by Kurds of the Erebiyan tribe and had a population of 71 in 2021.

References 

Villages in Hasankeyf District
Kurdish settlements in Batman Province